Gmina Boleszkowice is a rural gmina (administrative district) in Myślibórz County, West Pomeranian Voivodeship, in north-western Poland, on the German border.

As of 2016, the population is 2,902.

The gmina contains part of the protected area called Ujście Warty Landscape Park.

Villages
Gmina Boleszkowice contains the villages and settlements of Boleszkowice, Chlewice, Chwarszczany, Gudzisz, Kaleńsko, Namyślin, Porzecze, Reczyce, Wielopole, Wierutno, Wysoka and Wyszyna.

Neighbouring gminas
Gmina Boleszkowice is bordered by the town of Kostrzyn nad Odrą and by the gminas of Dębno and Mieszkowice. It also borders Germany.

References

Polish official population figures 2006

Boleszkowice
Myślibórz County